Vlastimil Válek (born 17 May 1960) is a Czech radiologist and politician, serving as Deputy Prime Minister and Minister of Health since 17 December 2021, in the cabinet of Petr Fiala. He has been a member of the Chamber of Deputies of the Czech Republic since 2017, representing TOP 09.

Early life and professional career
Válek was born in 1960 in Brno. He spent his childhood in Poštorná and Břeclav, and graduated from Břeclav Gymnazium in 1979. He graduated from the Faculty of Medicine at Masaryk University (MUNI) in 1985 with a degree in radiodiagnostics, and in the same year joined the staff of Brno University Hospital in Bohunice, where he is now head of the Department of Radiology and Nuclear Medicine, focusing on the diagnosis and treatment of abdominal tumors. Since 1993, he has also been working at the MUNI Faculty of Medicine as a professor of radiology. For the period from 2014 to 2017, he was elected chairman of the Czech Radiological Society of the Czech Medical Society JE Purkyně. He has published research in Czech and foreign medical journals, and regularly lectures at foreign conferences and universities.

Political career
In 2010, Válek was elected as a non-partisan for TOP 09 by representatives of the Brno-Líšeň City District. He subsequently joined TOP 09 in 2013 and defended his seat in the 2014 elections. In regional elections in 2012, he was elected to the South Moravian Regional Assembly. In the legislative elections in 2017, he was the leader of TOP 09 in the South Moravian Region and was elected to the Chamber of Deputies. In November 2019 he was elected vice-chairman of TOP 09, and in January 2021 also Chairman of the party's parliamentary group. He was re-elected to the Chamber of Deputies in 2021, and subsequently nominated as the Minister of Health in the new government of Petr Fiala.

Personal life
Válek is married and has four children. He lives in the Líšeň district of Brno. His interests include dulcimer music, choral singing, literature and Czech art.

References

1960 births
Living people
Politicians from Brno
Members of the Chamber of Deputies of the Czech Republic (2017–2021)
Members of the Chamber of Deputies of the Czech Republic (2021–2025)
Health ministers of the Czech Republic
TOP 09 Government ministers
TOP 09 MPs
Masaryk University alumni